Cartoone were a Scottish band formed in 1967.  Their debut album featured Jimmy Page as guest musician.

History
Cartoone were formed in 1967 from a band called The Chevlons. They toured all over Scotland in support of other acts such as the Tremeloes, the Merseybeats and the Hollies.

In 1968, the band moved to London in hope of landing a recording contract. Through Lulu they contacted songwriter Mark London (husband of Lulu's manager Marion Massey) and showed him some of the songs they had written. London was impressed with the band and their songs and took them into a recording studio to record four songs with just acoustic guitars. London then took those songs to Ahmet Ertegün and Jerry Wexler of Atlantic Records, who subsequently signed Cartoone to a two-album deal.  They were the first British rock band to sign with Atlantic, predating Led Zeppelin by several months.

The self-titled debut album, featuring Jimmy Page on guitar for several tracks, was released on Atlantic in January 1969.  Cartoone appeared on BBC TV on It's Happening for Lulu (12 December 1968) and Top of the Pops (16 January 1969) performing "Penny for the Sun".

In April 1969, Cartoone went to the United States to support Led Zeppelin on tour.  After the tour Atlantic Records dropped the band, and refused to release their second album, Reflections, which featured Leslie Harvey on guitar.

Discography

Albums

Singles

References

External links
 Cartoone Myspace Page
 [ Cartoone Allmusic Page]

Scottish pop music groups
Scottish rock music groups
Musical groups established in 1967
Atlantic Records artists
Musical groups disestablished in 1970
1967 establishments in Scotland